The 2000 European Promotion Cup for Men was the 7th edition of this tournament. It was hosted in Andorra la Vella, Andorra and Andorra retained its title after winning all its five games.

Standings

External links
FIBA Archive

2000
1999–2000 in European basketball
International basketball competitions hosted by Andorra
2000 in Andorran sport